Soul Happening! is an album by organist Don Patterson recorded in 1966 and released on the Prestige label.

Reception

Allmusic awarded the album 3 stars.

Track listing 
 "Wade in the Water" (Traditional) 5:25  
 "La Bamba" (Traditional) 5:00   
 "Strangers in the Night" (Bert Kaempfert, Charles Singleton, Eddie Snyder) 7:35  
 "Up Tight" (Stevie Wonder, Sylvia Moy, Henry Cosby) 3:20   
 "Love Letters" (Victor Young, Edward Heyman) 6:56  
 "Wee Dot" (J. J. Johnson) 6:00

Personnel 
Don Patterson - organ
Vincent "Vinnie" Corrao - guitar
Billy James - drums

References 

Don Patterson (organist) albums
1966 albums
Prestige Records albums
Albums produced by Cal Lampley
Albums recorded at Van Gelder Studio